Carne asada fries are a local specialty found on the menus of restaurants primarily in the American Southwest, including San Diego,  where it originated. The dish is also served at Petco Park  and Dodger Stadium. By 2015, fast food chain Del Taco began to sell the item.

Lolita's Mexican Food in San Diego claims to have originated the dish in the late 1990s, inspired by a suggestion from their tortilla distributor.

This item is not normally featured on the menu at more traditional Mexican restaurants.

Ingredients
The dish typically consists of french fries, carne asada, guacamole, sour cream, and cheese.  Typically, the fries are of the shoestring variety, but other cuts may be used, as well. The carne asada is usually finely chopped to avoid the need for a knife or additional cutting on the part of the consumer. The cheese is commonly cotija, although many establishments use a less-costly shredded cheese mix which melts with the other ingredients and keeps longer.

In Los Angeles, the dish may also contain refried beans; The dish is high in calories, with a meal-sized portion containing 2000 calories or more.

Similar dishes

 California burrito
 Chili cheese fries
 Garbage plate
 Halal snack pack
 Salchipapa
 Kapsalon
 Poutine
A similar dish, steak frites, tends to cost more.

References

External links

French fries
Meat and potatoes dishes
Culture of San Diego
Cuisine of the Southwestern United States
Fried foods
Fast food